This article is a list of diplomats of Japan.

Yasushi Akashi (1931-)
Ken Harada (?-1973)
Hasekura Tsunenaga (1571-1622)
Inagaki Manjirō (1861-1908)
Hiroshi Inomata
Komura Jutarō (1855-1911)
Katsuhiko Oku (1958-2003)
Motono Ichirō (1862-1918)
Kenzo Oshima (1943–2021)
Setsuzō Sawada (1884-1976)
Chiune Sugihara (1900-1986)
Tatsuo Kawai (1889-1965)
Kiyoshi Uchiyama
Tokugawa Iesato (1863-1940)
Tokugawa Iemasa (1884 – 1963)

See also
List of Ambassadors from Japan to Algeria
List of Ambassadors from Japan to Angola
List of diplomats of Japan to Hawaii
List of Ambassadors from Japan to Lithuania

Diplomats
Japan